is an underground metro station located in Atsuta-ku, Nagoya, Aichi Prefecture, Japan operated by the Nagoya Municipal Subway's Meikō Line. It is located 2.6 kilometers from the terminus of the Meikō Line at Kanayama Station.

History
Rokuban-chō Station opened on 29 March 1971.

Lines

 (Station E03)

Layout
Rokuban-chō Station

Platforms

There are two wickets, the North Wicket, beyond which are Exit 1 and Exit 4, and the South Wicket, beyond which are Exit 2 and Exit 3.  On Platform 1, train door 18 is closest to the elevator, door 1 is closest to the escalator, and doors 1 and 18 are closest to the stairs.  On Platform 2, door 1 is closest to the elevator and doors 1 and 18 are closest to the stairs.  There are public phones near the elevators on the platforms, near the wicket, and near Exit 4.  There is a handicapped-accessible bathroom with a baby changing outside the North Wicket.  Near Exit 4, there is a rest area.  Exit 1 has another elevator to the ground, and Exit 1 leads to a city bus terminal.

References

External links

 Rokuban-chō Station's web page at the Nagoya Transportation Bureau's web site 

Atsuta-ku, Nagoya
Railway stations in Japan opened in 1971
Railway stations in Nagoya
Stations of Nagoya Municipal Subway